Mamit district is one of the eleven districts of Mizoram state in India. Mamit is located at the western part of Mizoram. It shares an international border with Bangladesh, divided by the Sajek river.
Mamit district has a very significance in term of National security due to border district. Dampa forest and Dampa tiger reserve, the most important location in  Mazoram fall under Mamit district.

Geography
The district is bounded on the north by Hailakandi district of Assam state, on the west by North Tripura district of Tripura state and Bangladesh, on the south by Lunglei district and on the east by Kolasib and Aizawl districts. The district occupies an area of 3025.75 km². Mamit town is the administrative headquarters of the district.

Divisions
The district has 4 R.D. Blocks, Mamit, Reiek, West Phaileng and Zawlnuam. The district has 3 legislative assembly constituencies. These are Hachhek, Dampa and Mamit.

Demographics

According to the 2011 census Mamit district has a population of 86,364, roughly equal to the nation of Andorra. This gives it a ranking of 618th in India (out of a total of 640). Its population growth rate over the decade 2001-2011 was  37.56%. Mamit has a sex ratio of 927 females for every 1000 males, and a literacy rate of 84.93%.

Economy 

Indian has set up several Border Haats (markets) and ICP (Integrated Check Posts) in Mizoram to boost the border trade and Look-East connectivity to Trans-Asian Railway and Asian Highway Network (via AH1). Marpara and Tuipuibari on Bangladesh–India border are two ICP in Mamit district.

Flora and fauna

In 1985 Mamit district became home to Dampa Tiger Reserve, which has an area of 500 km².

References

External links
 Official site

 
Districts of Mizoram
Minority Concentrated Districts in India